"Roman in Moscow" is a song by rapper Nicki Minaj. It was released on December 2, 2011, as a teaser for her second album, Pink Friday: Roman Reloaded, although it was not included in the official track listing of the album. The song was written by Onika Maraj, Nicholas Warwar, Raymond Diaz, Mike Aiello, Safaree Samuels, Bryan Williams and produced by Streetrunner and Sarom.

The song peaked on the Billboard Hot 100 at number 64 and the Billboard R&B/Hip-Hop Digital Songs chart at number 13 in December 2011.

Background
Minaj announced the release in early December 2011 stating it was the "wackest thing on the album". The song was not included on the final track listing. When asked by a fan on Twitter as to why it was not included, Minaj replied that she didn't like the song much.

Music video
Minaj filmed the music video for "Roman in Moscow" on December 18, 2011. It was directed by Hype Williams. Prior to filming the video, Minaj gave a hint of the storyline, she stated: "Well, he was there [in Moscow] secretly because [alter ego] Martha wanted him to go there, so they put him in this thing with monks and nuns; they were trying to rehabilitate him, but I can't tell exactly what happened, you'll just see it in the video format, but let's just say he did get out of there."

The video for "Roman in Moscow" was never released.

April 20, 2020, Minaj confirmed the initial release of the music video to be sometime in October 2020. As of December 2021, the music video has still not seen the light of day.

Live performances
Minaj performed "Roman in Moscow" along with "Turn Me On" and "Super Bass" for 2012 New Years on Dick Clark's New Year's Rockin' Eve with Ryan Seacrest. She performed it on selected dates of her Pink Friday Tour and Pink Friday: Reloaded Tour.

References

Nicki Minaj songs
Songs written by Nicki Minaj
2011 singles
Cash Money Records singles
Music videos directed by Hype Williams
Songs written by Birdman (rapper)
Songs written by Safaree Samuels
2011 songs